Rímur is a limited EP record released independently by Sigur Rós featuring Steindór Andersen performing rímur. It was sold during the band's spring 2001 tour. Only 1000 copies of the EP were printed.

A live performance of "Á ferð til Breiðafjarðar vorið 1922" with Steindór later appeared on the band's 2007 DVD release Heima.

Track listing

References 

2001 EPs
Sigur Rós albums